The third season of RuPaul's Drag Race All Stars began airing on January 25, 2018. The season was announced in August 2017, and 9 of the 10 cast members were revealed during a VH1 television special titled "Exclusive Queen Ruveal", which aired on October 20, 2017. This season featured ten "All Star" contestants, selected from the show's first season through to its ninth season, who competed to be inducted into the "Drag Race Hall of Fame".

As in the previous season, the top two queens in the challenge compete in a "Lip Sync for Your Legacy," with the winner of the lip sync earning $10,000 and choosing which of the bottom queens gets eliminated. A new twist on how the top queens of the season were chosen was revealed in the season's last episode. The previously eliminated queens returned in the finale and voted for the top two out of the remaining top four finalists, from there on the two queens with the most votes advanced while the other two were subsequently eliminated. The prizes for the winner of the competition are a one-year supply of Anastasia Beverly Hills cosmetics and a cash prize of $100,000.

The winner of the third season of RuPaul's Drag Race All Stars was Trixie Mattel, with Kennedy Davenport being the runner-up.

Contestants 

Ages, names, and cities stated are at time of filming.

Notes:

Contestant progress

Jury vote
In the finale episode the eliminated queens were invited back as jurors. They were given two votes each to decide which of the remaining contestants would make the final two, with their first vote worth two points and the second one point. The finalists were given the chance to plead their case prior to the vote.

 The vote was worth two points being the first choice of the juror.
 The vote was worth one point being the second choice of the juror.
 The contestant received the most votes and made it to the final lip sync.
 The contestant received the second most votes and made it to the final lip sync.
 The contestant did not collect enough points to make it to the final lip sync.

Lip syncs
Legend:

Notes:

Guest judges
Listed in chronological order:

Vanessa Hudgens, actress and singer
Todrick Hall, actor and singer
Vanessa Williams, actress and singer
Constance Zimmer, actress
Jeffrey Bowyer-Chapman, actor and model
Nicole Byer, comedian and actress
Kristin Chenoweth, actress and singer
Tituss Burgess, actor and singer
Shay Mitchell, actress and model
Adam Lambert, singer and actor
Emma Bunton, singer and actress
Chris Colfer, actor and singer
Garcelle Beauvais, actress and model

Special guests 
Guests who appeared in episodes but did not judge on the main stage (in order of appearance):

Chad Michaels, runner-up from season four and winner of season one of All Stars
Alaska, runner-up from season five and winner of season two of All Stars
Marc Jacobs, fashion designer
Nancy Pelosi, former Speaker of the United States House of Representatives and Representative for California's 12th congressional district

Episodes

Leak
On February 15, 2018, the series production company World of Wonder filed a lawsuit against an anonymous leaker using the alias RealityTVLeaks. According to the lawsuit, RealityTVLeaks posted several visuals from the season on various social media websites such as Reddit, Twitter, and Instagram before each episode's airing—including runway themes, challenges, episode titles, and eliminated queens. Additionally, a producer from the show stated that the leaker removed "information identifying [World of Wonder] as the copyright owner and author" before adding "misleading copyright management information falsely identifying [the defendants] as the copyright owners and authors." World of Wonder launched the suit because of the defendant's "unlawful theft and public dissemination of episodes of the popular and critically-acclaimed reality television show," and the production company confirmed it is seeking damages of $300,000, including $150,000 for each infringed episode and $25,000 per violation of "actual damages" and defendants' profits.

Ratings

Critical reception 

Although a ratings success, the season was panned by the critics, following the high bar set by All Stars 2. Vulture, in writing a summation review, described the season as "truly one of the roughest seasons of the show ever. After a stellar, jaw-unhingingly good All Stars 2, this season felt more like an embarrassing cousin you brought to gay happy hour who wears double polos". The A.V. Club similarly described the season as disappointing; in their final review of the season, they wrote, "I should be celebrating the crowning of a new queen in the Drag Race hall of fame, but Drag Race All Stars season three has left me feeling totally underwhelmed and wondering, What’s the point?"

Vulture did however make the point that although the season did not live up to expectations, "even at its worst, it’s still one of the best, if not the best goddamn reality competition show on television".

References

External links 
 

2018 American television seasons
Internet leaks
RuPaul's Drag Race All Stars seasons